The College of Technology London (CTL) was a private college in Bow Road, offering  full-time     degrees in Information technology and  management in partnership with  the University of Wales, Lampeter, including the MBA.

References

External links
 https://web.archive.org/web/20071012025111/http://www.ctlondon.ac.uk/
 https://web.archive.org/web/20070414175026/http://www.lamp.ac.uk/recruitment/press_releases/mit_partnership.htm
 https://web.archive.org/web/20101130135332/http://www.lamp.ac.uk/cymraeg/recriwtio/wasg/2007/llambed_llundain.html

University of Wales, Lampeter
Science and technology in London
Education in London
Bow, London